Diego Tenorio Benavente (born April 21, 1959) is a Northern Mariana Islander politician who served as the sixth lieutenant governor of the Northern Mariana Islands from January 14, 2002 to January 9, 2006, under former Governor Juan Babauta.

Biography 
Benavente first ran for election in 1987, when he narrowly lost his bid for election to the Northern Mariana Islands House of Representatives in Precinct II by just six votes. However, Benavente was elected to the House in his second campaign in 1989. He served in the House for six consecutive terms, including three terms as the Speaker of the House. He left the House in 2000 to run for Lieutenant Governor in 2001.

Benavente was elected Lieutenant Governor of the Northern Mariana Islands as the running mate of Juan Babauta in the 2001 gubernatorial election. He served in office from 2002 to 2006. Babauta and Benavente lost their bid for re-election in 2005 to Covenant Party candidate Benigno Fitial and his running mate, Timothy Villagomez.

Benavente announced his candidacy for Governor in the 2009 election on December 11, 2008. However, Benavente dropped out of the race in February 2009 leaving two candidates - Heinz Hofschneider and Juan Babauta - in the race for the Republican nomination.

Benavente was again elected to the CNMI House of Representatives in 2007. He is currently serves as the Minority Leader of the Northern Mariana Islands House of Representatives as of April 2011.

References

1959 births
Lieutenant Governors of the Northern Mariana Islands
Living people
Republican Party (Northern Mariana Islands) politicians
Speakers of the Northern Mariana Islands House of Representatives